Sukhachya Sarini He Man Baware is an Marathi language television series which aired on Colors Marathi from 9 October 2018 and stopped on 24 October 2020.

Reception 
It gained fifth position in Week 7 of 2020 with 3.0 TRP in Top 5 Marathi TV Shows.

Airing history

Plot 
It is a story of Siddharth and Anushri. Sid, a business tycoon falls in love with Anu, a widow who only sees him as a best friend. Later, he is successful in making her fall for him but the main struggle is to convince his mother.

Cast 
 Shashank Ketkar as Siddharth Tatwawadi (Sid)
 Mrunal Dusanis as Anushri Dattatray Dixit / Anushri Siddharth Tatwawadi (Anu)
 Sharmishtha Raut as Sanyogeeta Tatwawadi (Sid's sister)
 Vandana Gupte / Asha Shelar as Durga Tatwawadi (Sid's mother) 
 Pradeep Patwardhan as Sid's uncle
 Ashwini Mukadam as Sid's aunt
 Nayana Apte Joshi as Sid's grandmother
 Sangram Samel as Samrat Tatwawadi (Sid's brother)
 Vidisha Mhaskar as Sanvi Samrat Tatwawadi (Sid's Vahini)
 Madhavi Juvekar as Anu's Vahini
 Sayalee Parab-Shelar as Neha
 Shalaka Pawar
 Trushna Chandratre

Awards

Adaptations

References

External links 
 
 Sukhachya Sarini He Man Baware on Voot

Marathi-language television shows
2018 Indian television series debuts
Colors Marathi original programming
2020 Indian television series endings